Bahulara Ancient Temple is located in Bahulara village in the  Onda II village panchayat, in the Onda CD block in the Bankura Sadar subdivision of the Bankura district in the Indian state of West Bengal.

Geography

Location

Note: The map alongside presents some of the notable locations in the subdivision. All places marked in the map are linked in the larger full screen map.

Siddheshwara temple
The Siddheshwara  Shiva temple at Bahulara is well known for its unique architectural style and exquisite cut-brick and lime-stucco ornamentation of the walls.This temple is one of the oldest of its types with sikhara of Nagara style. Possibly it was built sometime approximately around 8th-11th century CE as a Jain/Buddhist shrine and later on got reconsecrated as a shaivite monument by the Malla monarchs of Bishnupur. Other than the central Shiva lingam the sanctum sanctorum or the garbhagriha has figurines of Ganesha, Jain tirthankar Parshvsanatha and one of  Mahisasurmardini. But the temple is dedicated to Siddhesvara Mahadeva. Height of this temple is 19.2 metre at present.

Situated on the banks of the Dwarakeswar River, "Siddheshwara temple at Bahulara in the Bankura district is probably the finest specimen of a brick built  temple of medieval period now standing in Bengal," according to Nalini Bhattasali. The topmost portion of the spire, called the amalaka, has been damaged at some point in the past, and furthermore in spite of recent restorative efforts by the government much of the temple's original ornamentations had fallen prey to the ravages of time. In the month of Chaitra the Bahulara Shiva Gajan takes place over the span of three days with hundreds of devotees attending the festival.

Buddhist and Jain centre
According to Binoy Ghosh, the various habitational and ritualistic mounds surrounding the temple at Bahulara have led archaeologists to speculate that it was a thriving Buddhist centre at some ancient point of time. Prior to the dominance of Shaivism and Shaktism, the area was influenced by Buddhism and Jainism from the late millenniums BCE to the early centuries CE until roughly the cusp of the 7th and 8th centuries CE when the kingdom of Mallabhum was established. Archaeologists feel that the temple was built in the Pala era. Ananda Coomaraswamy believes that the present  was built in the 10th century. Others feel that it could be a century or two later. Jatar Deul, in the Sundarbans, came up during the same period. The temples at Dihar, in Bankura district, are also .

Rekha deul
David J. McCutchion says that the pre-dominant traditional architectural style for temples in the western areas of Bengal in the pre-Muslim period is the tall curvilinear rekha deul and it went on developing from the late 7th century or early 8th century to around the 12th century, increasing its complexity and height but retaining its basic features. Such temples had “curvilinear shikhara with chaitya mesh decoration, surmounted by a large amalaka and kalasa finial. Examples of such dilapidated  are still standing at Satdeula (in Bardhaman), Bahulara and Sonatapal (in Bankura) and Deulghat (in Purulia).  On the brick  already mentioned here, plus Jatar (in 24 Parganas) and Para (in Purulia), “we find extensive and remarkably fine stucco work on carved brick”.

According to the List of Monuments of National Importance in West Bengal the Ancient Temple at Bahulara is an ASI listed monument.

Bahulara picture gallery

References

External links

 
 

Temples in West Bengal
Monuments of National Importance in West Bengal
Tourist attractions in Bankura district